Pierre Viala (24 September 1859 in Lavérune – 11 February 1936) was a French scientist.

In 1901–1910 he and Victor Vermorel published Ampélographie. Traité général de viticulture, a seven-volume ampelography of 3,200 pages describing 5,200 grape varieties.

He has been honoured in the naming of 2 taxa of fungi; 
Vialaea by Pier Andrea Saccardo in 1896 (Vialaeaceae family)
Vialina by Mario Curzi in 1935, which is now a synonym of Phoma .

References

1859 births
1936 deaths
19th-century French botanists
Members of the French Academy of Sciences
20th-century French botanists
French viticulturists